Tenera is a genus of moth in the family Gelechiidae. It contains the species Tenera vittata, which is found in the Russian Far East.

References

Anomologinae